Rudna Wielka may refer to the following places in Poland:
Rudna Wielka, Lower Silesian Voivodeship (south-west Poland)
Rudna Wielka, Podkarpackie Voivodeship (south-east Poland)